"Arena" is the eighteenth episode of the first season of the American science fiction television series Star Trek. Written by Gene L. Coon (based on a 1944 short story of the same name by Fredric Brown) and directed by Joseph Pevney, the episode was first broadcast on January 19, 1967.

In the episode, while pursuing a Gorn vessel for an apparently unprovoked attack on a Federation outpost, Captain Kirk is forced by powerful entities to battle the opposing captain.

Plot
The USS Enterprise arrives at the Cestus III Outpost by invitation of its commanding officer, but the crew find the outpost obliterated. Captain Kirk, First Officer Spock, Chief Medical Officer Dr. McCoy, and a security force beam down to find one survivor who says the base came under heavy bombardment from an unknown enemy. The landing party find themselves under fire from nearby, with two of the security team killed in the initial volley. The Enterprise is also under attack from an unknown vessel, preventing the crew from beaming up the landing party. On the surface, Kirk finds a grenade launcher from the outpost's stores, and uses it to scatter the alien forces. The alien ship recovers its crew from the surface and begins to retreat. The landing party is beamed back aboard Enterprise before they give chase.

Both ships enter an unexplored sector of space, and shortly thereafter, lose all propulsion power. Enterprise is contacted by a species calling themselves the Metrons, who zealously guard their sector of space from intrusion. They announce that they will pit the respective captains against each other in "trial by combat", a one-to-one battle to the death, with the ship of the losing captain to be destroyed and the other ship free to leave. Captain Kirk is suddenly transported to the surface of a rocky, barren planet along with the captain of the other ship, who is of a reptilian species known as the Gorn. The Metrons speak to Kirk, explaining that while neither captain has communication with his ship, each has been given a vocal recording device that will  transmit their words to their ships, however they are unaware that they also translate their words to the opposing captain as well. Kirk is told that the planet has numerous resources either captain can use to defeat the other. Aboard Enterprise, the crew are allowed to watch Kirk's actions.

Kirk attempts to communicate with the Gorn, but receives no response. The Gorn tracks down Kirk, and Kirk realizes he is outmatched physically and relies on his agility to outrun the Gorn. Kirk gets caught in a rope trap set by the Gorn that injures his leg and slows him down. The Gorn finally communicates with Kirk via the translation device and offers to put him out of his misery. Kirk accuses the Gorns of being butchers, but the alien defends their attack on Cestus III, stating the outpost had been built in what the Gorns considered to be their territory. They viewed the Federation's presence in this part of space as an intrusion and a possible prelude to full-scale invasion.

Trying to stay ahead of the Gorn, Kirk discovers numerous valuable minerals and resources on the planet, seemingly useless at this point. He is inspired upon finding stalks of bamboo and raw chemicals that can be mixed into a black powder formula. He constructs a makeshift weapon, using chunks of diamond as ammunition. Kirk barely completes the assembly as the Gorn arrives and fires it, severely wounding the Gorn. As Kirk prepares to deal a death blow, he considers the Gorn's claims that the attack on Cestus III was only in self-defense, and allows him to live. Suddenly, the Gorn disappears, and a Metron appears to Kirk, congratulating him on not only winning the battle but showing the advanced trait of mercy for one's enemy. Kirk declines the Metrons' offer to destroy the Gorn ship, leading the Metron to comment that "you are still half savage, but there is hope", and that the Federation should seek out the Metrons again in several thousand years time. Suddenly Kirk finds himself back aboard Enterprise, his injuries healed, and the crew finds itself 500 parsecs from Metron space, the Gorn ship nowhere in range.

Production

The episode was filmed in part on location at Vasquez Rocks, which was subsequently used as a shooting location in other Star Trek episodes and films.

The episode marked the directorial debut of Joseph Pevney, who was hired by Gene L. Coon.

The Gorn captain's vocalizations were provided by actor Ted Cassidy, who also appeared in person in the Star Trek episode "What Are Little Girls Made Of?" and provided the menacing voice of Balok in the episode "The Corbomite Maneuver". The Gorn was portrayed by stuntmen Bobby Clark and Gary Combs and by extra Bill Blackburn in close-ups.

William Shatner recalls standing too close to a stage prop explosion during the filming of the episode, causing tinnitus, which became chronic. Leonard Nimoy was also afflicted. Shatner has it in his left ear and Nimoy had it in his right ear.

"Arena" was the first episode of Star Trek to be broadcast in colour in the UK (BBC, November 1969).

Writing 
Arena was Gene L Coon's first episode as script writer.

According to an account by Herbert Solow in the book Inside Star Trek, The Real Story, the similarity to Brown's short story may have come from a subconscious inspiration. After Coon had written what he thought was an original script, Desilu's research department, headed by Kellam de Forest, noted the similarity. It was therefore agreed that Desilu's Business Affairs office would call Brown and offer a fair price for the story, before it was shot and broadcast. Brown agreed without knowing that the script had already been written; he was granted screen credit for the story.

Connections 
This episode introduced elements to the Star Trek canon, including the Gorn species, the Metron species and the planet Cestus III. Cestus III is mentioned later as the home planet of Star Trek: Deep Space Nine character Kasidy Yates, and is referenced in Star Trek non-canon novels.

In the 2010s, actor William Shatner re-enacted his battle fighting the Gorn, for an advertisement for the 2013 Star Trek video game (Kelvin timeline). In the spot they have a similar fight, but it takes place in a modern day living room and starts with the two playing a console video game together in co-op mode.

Reception
In 2010, SciFiNow ranked this the second best episode of the original series.

Zack Handlen of The A.V. Club gave the episode an 'A−' rating, noting the episode's influence and noting the use of a theme of Star Trek, the "uncertainty of exploration".

In 2013, The Hollywood Reporter, ranked the Kirk vs. Gorn fight as one of the top 15 key moments of the original series.

In a ranking in 2017 of the "25 greatest episodes" of all Star Trek, including later series, "Arena" was ranked as the 6th best. At that time there were about 726 episodes of Star Trek television.

IGN ranked "Arena" number 10 in a top ten list of the original series episodes.

In 2016, Newsweek ranked "Arena" as one of the best episodes of the original series, and they note it was a popular episode. In 2016, Business Insider ranked "Arena" the 12th best episode of the original series.

In 2016, Empire ranked this the 41st best out of the top 50 episodes of all the 700 plus Star Trek television episodes. They note that Kirk wins in this episode, not by killing a dangerous alien, called the Gorn, but by showing mercy which impresses the powerful aliens that pitted them against each other.

In 2016, Radio Times ranked the battle between Kirk and the Gorn, as the seventh best moment of all Star Trek film and television. They note that the action scene was filmed at the Vasquez rocks in southern California, USA. They also praised Shatner's unique acting style in his mission logs, and noted how many aspects of this episode are great examples of the science fiction genre in this period.

In 2018, Collider ranked this episode the 7th best original series episode. They praised the Gorn costume and noted that this episode introduces the powerful Metron aliens.

In 2017, Business Insider ranked "Arena" the 12th best episode of the original series.

In 2018, PopMatters ranked this the 6th best episode of the original series.

In 2019, Nerdist included this episode on their "Best of Kirk" binge-watching guide.

In 2019, CBR ranked "Arena" as one of the top eight most memorable episodes of the original Star Trek.

References

External links

 
 "Arena" at Memory Alpha
 "Arena" Screenshots before and after remastering at TrekMovie.com
 "Arena" Short story and episode comparison
 Bobby Clark talks about playing the Gorn

Star Trek: The Original Series (season 1) episodes
1967 American television episodes
Deserts in fiction
Television episodes written by Gene L. Coon
Television episodes directed by Joseph Pevney